Delage was a French luxury automobile and racecar company founded in 1905 by Louis Delâge in Levallois-Perret near Paris; it was acquired by Delahaye in 1935 and ceased operation in 1953.

On 7 November 2019, the association "Les Amis de Delage", created in 1956 and owner of the Delage brand, announced the re-founding of the company Delage Automobiles.

Early history
The company was founded in 1905 by Louis Delâge, who borrowed Fr 35,000, giving up a salary of F 600 a month to do so.

Its first location was on the Rue Cormeilles in Levallois-Perret. The company at first had just two lathes and three employees, one of them Peugeot's former chief designer. Delage initially produced parts for Helbé, with the De Dion-Bouton engine and chassis assembled by Helbé; Delage added only the body.

The first model was the Type A, a voiturette which appeared in 1906. Like other early carmakers, Delage participated in motor racing, entering the Coupe de Voiturettes held at Rambouillet in November 1906 with a  racer. Seven days of regularity trials decided the entrants, and one of the two  Delage specials was wrecked in the rain on the fifth; nevertheless, Ménard, the other works driver, came second in the event, behind a Sizaire-Naudin.

In 1907, the factory moved to the Rue Baudin Levallois, where a  workshop allowed it to grow. The two-cylinder Delages were no match for the competition this year at the Coupe des Voiturettes.

In 1908, the success enabled the development of the factory and entry into more Grand Prix races. That year, racing success returned: Delage won the Grand Prix des Voiturettes held 6 July. This event, six laps of the  Dieppe Grand Prix circuit, saw 47 starters. Delage fielded three cars: a pair with  De Dion-Bouton twins, driven by Thomas and Lucas-Bonnard, and a radical   one-cylinder (built by Nemorin Causan) in the hands of Delage dealer Albert Guyot. Guyot won at an average , not needing to stop for fuel. All three Delages finished this time, Thomas the quickest of the two-cylinder cars, while the team also took home the regularity prize. These good results contributed to total sales exceeding 300 cars for the year.

Delage converted to four-cylinder engines in 1909, at first provided by De Dion and Edouard Ballot; shortly, the company were producing their own sidevalve fours, too.

After an increase in sales, the existing facilities were too small, so in 1910 the factory moved to a new facility at 138 Boulevard de Verdun, Courbevoie. The following year saw the creation of advanced bodywork. By 1912, 350 workers were producing over 1000 cars annually, and offered four- and six-cylinder sidevalve engines.

During the First World War, Delage produced munitions. Production of passenger cars virtually stopped, with the exception of some fabrication for the Army. But the Delage factories were running full support for the war effort.

When the war concluded, Delage moved away from small cars and made its reputation with larger cars. First up was the CO, with a  fixed-head sidevalve six producing 20 hp. The CO plans had been drawn up during the conflict; this was the first passenger car with front brakes. It was joined by the DO with a 3-liter four.

The 1920s were really the first "Golden Age" of Delage. The most famous were the DE and DI: 4 cylinders of about 2 liters and 11 hp. Delage also attempted to compete with Hispano-Suiza, with the GL of 30 hp and 5954 cc, with some success. After that came a new generation of six-cylinder cars, like the MD (3174 cc) and DR (2516 cc), the best-selling vehicle in the history of the brand, designed by engineer Gaultier.

Both the CO and DO were replaced in 1922. The CO became the CO2, which changed to an overhead valve twin-plug head, producing , while the DO was supplanted by the DE with a  sidevalve four and, unusual in a production car even in this era, four-wheel brakes.

The next year, the new  DI also switched to OHV with a  four, fitted with magneto ignition and thermosyphon cooling; all had four-speed gearboxes and Zenith carburettors. At the other end of the scale, the GL (Grand Luxe), also known as the 40/50, replaced the CO2, being fitted with a magneto-fired  overhead cam six.

In 1923, a hillclimb car with DI chassis, larger wheels and tires, and  CO block (with three Zenith carburetors) was produced. Delage scored successes at La Turbie and Mont Ventoux. This car was joined by a  V12, which broke the course record at the Gaillon hillclimb, with Thomas at the wheel. A 1925 car had a  six, again using the GL block, with four valves per cylinder and twin overhead cams. Driven by Divo, it broke the Mont Ventoux course record in its debut. The car was destroyed by fire at the Phoenix Park meet in 1934.

The 1924 and 1925 DIS, with a  wheelbase, switched from Rolls-Royce-type locking wheel hubs to Rudge knock-ons, better cam, and bigger valves, while the 1925 and 1926 DISS on the same wheelbase. Some of the DISes were bodied by Kelsch. The DIS became the Series 6 in 1927, switching to coil ignition and water pump.

In 1926, Delage introduced the DM, with a  six, which made it emblematic of the era for the marque. The high-performance DMS had hotter cam, twin valve springs, and other improvements. A DR, with a choice of 2.2- and 2.5-liter sidevalve engines, also briefly appeared.

Competition

Delage entered the 1911 Coupe de l'Auto at Boulogne with a   four with two -diameter bellcrank-operated valves per cylinder controlled by camshafts in the crankcase. Works driver Paul Bablot won, at an average , with a 1m 11s over Boillot's Peugeot, followed home by Thomas in a second Delage; Delage also took the team prize.

Three cars were built for the  Amiens Grand Prix, though only two, Bablot's and Guyot's, actually entered. At the French Grand Prix, Delage put Bablot first, Guyot second, ahead of Pilette's 1908 Mercedes GP car, Salzer in a Mercedes, with Duray coming in fifth in the third Delage.

In 1913, the new type Y set the fastest lap time at the French Grand Prix at Le Mans, and in 1914, this same car won the 1914 Indianapolis 500 with René Thomas at the wheel. Thomas, Guyot, and Duray returned to the French Grand Prix with 4½-liter twin-cam desmodromic valved racers featuring twin carburettors, five-speed gearbox, and four-wheel brakes. While quick, they proved unreliable; only one finished, Duray's, in eighth.

In 1914, Delage emphasized its focus on competition by creating the type O Lyon Grand Prix, while at the same time moving towards the luxury car market with 6 cylinders of a large class. However, racing was severely curtailed during World War One.

 

In 1923, Louis Delage returned to competition with the innovative 12-cylinder 2-liter type 2 LCV. This car won the 1924 European Grand Prix in Lyon and the 1925 Grand Prix of ACF Montlhéry. A Delage 155 B won the first Grand Prix of Great-Britain in 1926, driven by Louis Wagner and Robert Senechal. The production of cars continued with the DI and the DI S SS. The DM evolved into the DMS and DML, equipped with a 6-cylinder 3-liter engine designed by Maurice Gaultier.

Delage's Grand Prix effort saw a Plancton-designed  four overhead cam V12. The  car, driven by Thomas, fell out of the French Grand Prix in 1923, but went on to perform well for the bulk of the 1923 and 1924 season.

Always passionate about racing, Louis Delage designed an 8-cylinder 1500 cc, the type 15 S 8. This car won four European Grands Prix races in 1927, and won Delage the title "World Champion of Car Builders" that same year.

A -powered D6 won the 1938 Tourist Trophy at Donington Park and came second at Le Mans. A single V12-powered car, intended for Le Mans, caught fire at the 1938 International Trophy at Brooklands.

Postwar, the best results Delage had were seconds at the 1949 Le Mans and 1950 Paris Grand Prix.

The D6 and the D8: The Classic Era
1930 saw the launch of the 6-cylinder Delage D6 which would form the mainstay of the manufacturer's passenger car range until 1954.

For 1930 Maurice Gaultier designed an 8-cylinder in-line 4,061 cc, evolving the type D8 into the type D8 S (S for Sport).

The D8 was the pinnacle of the marque.

But the backlash of the economic crisis of 1929 arrived and manufacturers of luxury cars all over the world suffered from poor sales. The commercial and financial situation of the firm was badly shaken. In 1932 Delage introduced the type D6-11 (6-cylinder 2101 cc), and two years later the new eight-cylinder Delage, type D8-15 (2768 cc). These two models, equipped with independent front wheel suspension did not increase sale figures. The transverse leaf and wishbone independent front suspension was licensed by Studebaker for their cars. Delage also produced a very limited number of higher-performance D6-11S models during 1933 and 1934. These "S" models ("S" being an abbreviation for Surbaisse, which means "lowered" in French) were built on a lowered and shorter chassis. 

The junior D6s shared Delahaye front suspension design, but had hydraulic rather than Delahaye cable-actuated brakes, also shared the Cotal gearbox with the D8. The D6/70 of 1936 was powered by a  six, the 1938 D6/75 a 2.8-liter six, and the postwar D8/3L Olympic a 3-liter six. At the bottom of the range was a 1.5-liter four that lasted until 1936.

Financial pressures never disappeared, however, and during the Spring of 1932 Louis Delage was obliged to take out a 25 Million franc loan in order to finance the tooling needed to put the D6 into production. It was at this time that he also entered into negotiations with Peugeot about using their dealership and service network. These negotiations went nowhere, and discussions with other possible partners/rescuers also came to nothing. There were also personal problems involving his marriage which necessitated a rearrangement of Delage's personal finances, although in the event it was the sale of his expensive home in the Champs-Élysées that reduced the pressure on his finances if only in the short term.

The last models to emerge from the factory in Courbevoie were the types D6-65, D8-85 and D8-105, designed by engineer Michelat. On 20 April 1935 the factory in Courbevoie went into voluntary liquidation.

But Louis Delage would not admit defeat, and with the help of a businessman called Walter Watney created the Société Nouvelle des Automobiles Delage (SAFAD), to market Delage cars, assembled from production Delahayes. This union created the 4-cylinder DI 12 and the D8 120, and also the 6-cylinder D6 70. Watney had taken control as president of SAFAD, but he was a British national and in June 1940 he was obliged to leave Paris as the German Army arrived. Watney stayed in France, at his villa in Beaulieu, until the end of 1942 after the Germans had completed their occupation, but already in December 1940 the presidency of the SAFAD business had passed directly into the control of Delahaye. In any event, since the outbreak of the war Delage had been largely inactive, although they did undertake work on a project to replace the six-cylinder engine of the Hotchkiss H39 tank with the more powerful 8-cylinder unit from the Delage D8 120.

Racing aero-engines
Delage produced at least two types of racing aero-engine during the early 1930s. The Delage 12 CED was fitted to the Kellner-Béchereau 28VD racing aircraft, intended to compete in the 1933 Coupe Deutsch de la Meurthe air race. Unfortunately the aircraft crashed during qualification trials for the race on 12 May 1933. The second engine type, the Delage 12 GV, remains a mystery, with very little information available.

After the Second World War
A large prototype Delage D-180 limousine appeared at the 1946 Paris Motor Show, but there were evidently no further developments on this project, and by the next year the big prototype had quietly disappeared. At the 1947 Paris Motor Show only a single model was exhibited as the business focused on its six-cylinder 3-litre Delage D6 which in most respects will have been familiar to anyone who had known the 3-litre Delages of the 1930s. The car was offered with bodies by firms such as Chapron, Letourner & Marchand and Guilloré. A variety of coupe and cabriolet bodied D6s were produced. In addition, both Guilloré and Chapron produced a large saloon/sedan body. The two were remarkably similar, both being six-light four-door cars with conservative 1930s style shapes. Something else the two had in common was unexpectedly narrow rear doors, enforced by the combination of a long body, a long rear overhang and a relatively short wheelbase provided by the D6 chassis. A longer wheelbase 1952 special version, bodied by Guilloré, was owned by National Assembly president Edouard Herriot.

Nevertheless, these were difficult times for luxury auto-makers in France and by now the company's registered head office was the same as that for Delahaye: production statistics from the period group Delage and Delahaye together. Louis Delâge himself, who had lived in poverty and quasi-monastic isolation since bankruptcy in 1935 had enforced the transfer of his company to Delahaye, died in December 1947, and during the next few years any residual autonomy that the business had enjoyed disappeared. Increases in motoring taxes, most notably in 1948 and most savagely targeting cars with engines of above 2 litres, combined with the depressed economic conditions of post-war France to create a difficult market for luxury car manufacturers. In 1950 Delahaye produced 235 cars which will have included a significant number of Delages. In 1951 the combined production figure for the two brands slumped to 77: in 1952 it was down to 41. In 1953 Delage production ended.

Delage was absorbed into Hotchkiss along with Delahaye in 1954, and car manufacturing ended.

Refoundation 

On 7 November 2019, at the Lyon Époqu'auto show, Les Amis de Delage and entrepreneur Laurent Tapie, son of Bernard Tapie, announced that they had signed an agreement for relaunch the Delage Automobiles brand. Tapie becomes president of Delage Automobiles. The new Delage planned for this project is called the Delage D12. It will be produced in France like all Delages. Delage Automobiles has joined forces with racing driver Jacques Villeneuve as the development driver for the future production model. The car was presented at private events in Los Angeles and Orange County in California in December 2019, then in Monaco in September 2020, Geneva in November 2020 and Dubai in December 2020.

Voted "most beautiful car in the world" (best Design) by the jury of the Automobile Awards 2020/2021, only 30 units of the Delage D12 will be produced and sold at a price tag of 2 million Euros per car.

Models
 Delage CO (1918, 6 cyl, 4,524 cc)
  (1920, 2,121 cc)
 Delage CO2 (1921)
 Delage 2 LCV (1923, 12 cyl, 2L)
 Delage GL (5,954 cc)
 Delage DE
 Delage DH (12 cyl DH, 10,5L)
 Delage DI S
 Delage DI SS
 Delage DMS (6 cyl, 3L)
 Delage DML (6 cyl, 3L)
 Delage 15 S 8 (8 cyl, 1,500 cc)
 Delage GL (5,954 cc)
 Delage DM (6 cyl, 3,174 cc)
 Delage DR (6 cyl, 2,516 cc)
 Delage D4 (4 cyl, 1,480 cc)
 Delage D6-11 (6 cyl, 2,101 cc)
 Delage D8-15 (2,768 cc)
 Delage D6-65
 Delage D8-85
 Delage D8
 Delage D8 S (8 cyl, 4,061 cc)
 Delage D8-105
 Delage DI 12 (4 cyl)
 Delage D8 120
 Delage D6 70 (6 cyl)
 Delage D12 – 2021 (12 cyl, 7,604 cc + 110 hp motor)

Production volumes
During their years of independence, Delage made almost 40,000 cars at their workshops in Levallois and Courbevoie. After Delage production was subsumed into the Delahaye operation, approximately another 2,000 Delage badged cars were manufactured between 1935 and 1940. With the post-war resumption of passenger car production, 330 Delage cars appear to have been produced by Delahaye between 1946 and 1953.

Sources and further reading

External links
 Les Amis de Delage, website of Delage-collectors
 Delage World, web site maintained by collector Peter Jacobs

Car manufacturers of France
Defunct motor vehicle manufacturers of France
French racecar constructors
French brands
Luxury motor vehicle manufacturers
Vehicle manufacturing companies established in 1905
Manufacturing companies disestablished in 1953
1905 establishments in France
1953 disestablishments in France
Re-established companies
Vehicle manufacturing companies established in 2019
French companies established in 2019
French companies established in 1905